Pope Adrian II (also Hadrian II; 79214 December 872) was the bishop of Rome and ruler of the Papal States from 867 to his death. He continued the policy of his predecessor, Nicholas I. Despite seeking good relations with Louis II of Italy, he was placed under surveillance, and his wife and daughters were killed by Louis' supporters.

Family
Adrian was a member of a noble Roman family. In his youth, he married a woman named Stephania and had a daughter with her. Adrian was selected to become pope on 14 December 867. He was already at an advanced age, and objected to assuming the papacy. His wife and daughter moved with him to the Lateran Palace.

Pontificate
Adrian II maintained, but with less energy, the policies of his predecessor, Nicholas I. King Lothair II of Lotharingia, who died in 869, left Adrian to mediate between the Frankish kings with a view to secure the imperial inheritance to Lothair's brother, Louis II of Italy. Adrian sought to maintain good relations with Louis, since the latter's campaigns in southern Italy had the potential to free the papacy from the threat posed by the Muslims.

Patriarch Photius I of Constantinople, shortly after the council in which he had pronounced sentence of deposition against Pope Nicholas I, was driven from the patriarchate by a new Byzantine emperor, Basil the Macedonian, who favoured Photius' rival, Ignatius. The Fourth Council of Constantinople was convoked to decide this matter. At this council, Adrian was represented by legates who presided at the condemnation of Photius as a heretic, but did not succeed in coming to an understanding with Ignatius on the subject of jurisdiction over the Bulgarian Church.

Like Nicholas I, Adrian was forced to submit in temporal affairs to the interference of Emperor Louis II, who placed him under the surveillance of Bishop Arsenius of Orte, his confidential adviser, and Arsenius' nephew, Anastasius the Librarian. In 868, Adrian's wife and daughter were carried off and murdered by Arsenius' son Eleutherius, who had forcibly married the daughter.

Adrian died on 14 December 872, after exactly five years of pontificate.

See also

List of sexually active popes

References

Further reading

External links
Opera Omnia by Migne Patrologia Latina with analytical indexes

Popes
Italian popes
Adrian II
Adrian II
9th-century archbishops
Married Roman Catholic bishops
9th-century popes
Burials at St. Peter's Basilica